Ferdinand Payan was a French bicyclist of the early 20th century. He was born in Arles in 1870.

He participated in the 1903 Tour de France, the first Tour, and came in 12th place. He was 19 hours, 9 minutes and 2 seconds behind the winner Maurice Garin.

He died in 1961 in Nice.

Major competitions
 1903 Tour de France - 12th place
 1904 Tour de France - did not finish
 1906 Tour de France - 12th place
 1907 Tour de France - 10th place
 1908 Tour de France - 24th place
 1909 Tour de France - did not finish
 1911 Tour de France - did not finish
 1912 Tour de France - did not finish

References
 
 Official Tour de France results for Ferdinand Payan

French male cyclists
1870 births
1961 deaths
People from Arles
Sportspeople from Bouches-du-Rhône
Cyclists from Provence-Alpes-Côte d'Azur